Kate Clare Tilleczek (born 1963) is a Full professor at York University and a Tier 1 Canada Research Chair in Young Lives, Education & Global Good.

Early life and education
Tilleczek was born in 1963. Upon earning her Bachelor of Arts degree in Social Psychology from Wilfrid Laurier University, she enrolled at Laurentian University for her Master's degree and Nipissing University for her Bachelor of Education. Her doctoral degree was earned at the University of Toronto.

Career
After earning her PhD, Tilleczek joined the faculty at Laurentian University as an Associate professor. She was eventually offered a position with the University of Prince Edward Island (UPEI) in 2009 as a Canada Research Chair in Child/Youth Cultures and Transitions. While at UPEI, she continued her research with the Ontario Ministry of Education to study how children, families and teachers deal with and support the transitions from elementary to high school. Tilleczek also built and founded the Qualitative Research Co-laboratory through funding from the Canadian Foundation for Innovation which then became the Young Lives Research Laboratory (YLRL). 

During her tenure at UPEI, Tilleczek and her research team started the Wekimün School Project on Chiloé Island, which aimed to bring education to rural areas. Through collaboration with the community, they created a school and curriculum for the Indigenous youth using their knowledge and life experiences. She was also the recipient of the CEA Whitworth Award for her research on marginalized students and their transitions through the education system. 

In 2018, Tilleczek was offered a position as Full Professor at York University in Toronto, along with an appointment as a Tier 1 Canada Research Chair (CRC) in Young Lives, Education and Global Good. While at York, Tilleczek continued to develop the YLRL as a virtual Lab with the intention of removing geographical, linguistic, structural, and technological boundaries to knowledge and learning. As the lead investigator at her Lab, she conducted a five-year long study of youth (ages 16–24) in Canada, Australia, and Scotland to determine whether living immersed in digital technology could harm or benefit them. During the COVID-19 pandemic, Tilleczek also studied how youth used the social media app TikTok to vent their frustrations and its effect on their overall health. However, she also cautioned parents against setting strict limitations to screen time and encouraged them to work with their children to see how they use their online time. She says that "parents need to figure out if what they’re doing online is active, creative, educative or is it just digital junk."

Along with her duties at York, Tilleczek also sits on and leads various committees including; Pathways to Education Canada, Canadian Education Association Canada, and Community Health Systems Resource Group. She also serves as the Editor in Chief for Bloomsbury Education and Childhood Studies and on the International Advisory Board for Journal of Youth Studies.

References

External links

Living people
1963 births
Academic staff of York University
Academic staff of Laurentian University
Academic staff of the University of Prince Edward Island
Wilfrid Laurier University alumni
Laurentian University alumni
University of Toronto alumni
Canada Research Chairs
21st-century Canadian women writers
Canadian women academics
21st-century Canadian non-fiction writers